Alexander Mackendrick (September 8, 1912 – December 22, 1993) was an American-born director and professor, long based in Scotland. He was born in Boston, Massachusetts, and later moved to Scotland. He began making television commercials before moving into post-production editing and directing films, most notably for Ealing Studios where his films include Whisky Galore! (1949), The Man in the White Suit (1951), The Maggie (1954), and The Ladykillers (1955).

After his first American film Sweet Smell of Success (1957), his career as a director declined and he became Dean of the CalArts School of Film/Video in California. He was the cousin of Scottish writer Roger MacDougall.

Biography
He was born on 8 September 1912 the only child of Francis and Martha Mackendrick who had emigrated to the United States from Glasgow in 1911. His father was a ship builder and a civil engineer. When Mackendrick was six, his father died of influenza as a result of the influenza pandemic that swept the world just after World War I. His mother, in desperate need of work, decided to become a dress designer. In order to pursue that decision, it was necessary for Martha MacKendrick to hand her only son over to his grandfather, who took young MacKendrick back to Scotland in early 1919 when he was six years old. Mackendrick never saw or heard from his mother again.

Mackendrick had a sad and lonely childhood. He attended Hillhead High School in Glasgow from 1919 to 1926 and then went on to spend three years at the Glasgow School of Art. In the early 1930s, MacKendrick moved to London to work as an art director for the advertising firm J. Walter Thompson. Between 1936 and 1938, Mackendrick scripted five cinema commercials. He later reflected that his work in the advertising industry was invaluable, in spite of his extreme dislike of the industry itself. MacKendrick wrote his first film script with his cousin and close friend, Roger MacDougall. It was bought by Associated British and later released, after script revisions, as Midnight Menace (1937).

Career

At the start of the Second World War, Mackendrick was employed by the Minister of Information making British propaganda films. In 1942, he went to Algiers and then to Italy, working with the Psychological Warfare Division. He then shot newsreels, documentaries, made leaflets, and did radio news. In 1943, he became the director of the film unit and approved the production of Roberto Rossellini's early neorealist film, Rome, Open City (1945).

Ealing Studios
After the war, Mackendrick and Roger MacDougall set up Merlin Productions, where they produced documentaries for the Ministry of Information. Merlin Productions soon proved financially unviable. In 1946 Mackendrick joined Ealing Studios, originally as a scriptwriter and production designer,  where he worked for nine years and directed five  films made at Ealing;  Whisky Galore! (US: Tight Little Island, 1949), The Man in the White Suit (1951), Mandy (1952),  The Maggie (US: High and Dry, 1954) and The Ladykillers (1955), the first two and the last being among the best known of Ealing's films.

America
Mackendrick often spoke of his dislike of the film industry and decided to leave the United Kingdom for Hollywood in 1955. When the base of Ealing studios was sold that year, Mackendrick was cut loose to pursue a career as a freelance director, something he was never prepared to do:
At Ealing ... I was tremendously spoiled with all the logistical and financial troubles lifted off my shoulders, even if I had to do the films they told me to do. The reason why I have discovered myself so much happier teaching is that when I arrived here after the collapse of the world I had known as Ealing, I found that in order to make movies in Hollywood, you have to be a great deal-maker ... I have no talent for that ... I realised I was in the wrong business and got out.

The rest of his professional life was spent commuting between London and Los Angeles. His first film after his initial return to the United States was Sweet Smell of Success (1957), produced by Hecht-Hill-Lancaster Productions (HHL). This was a critically successful film about a press agent (Tony Curtis) who is wrapped up in a powerful newspaper columnist's (Burt Lancaster) plot to end the relationship between his younger sister and a jazz musician. Mackendrick got along poorly with the producers of the film because they felt that he was too much of a perfectionist. After Sweet Smell of Success, he returned to England to make the second HHL film, The Devil's Disciple (1959), but he was fired a month into production owing to lingering tension from their first project together. Mackendrick was devastated. In the same period, Mackendrick assisted Dutch film maker Bert Haanstra with the production of the comedy film, Fanfare (1958).

After his disappointment with HHL, Mackendrick directed several television commercials in Europe for Horlicks. Mackendrick was replaced on The Guns of Navarone for allegedly being too much of a perfectionist for spending more time than planned on scouting Mediterranean locations and insisting on elements of ancient Greek literature in the screenplay.

He also made a handful of films throughout the Sixties including Sammy Going South (1963) for former Ealing producer Michael Balcon now with Bryanston Pictures, A High Wind in Jamaica (1965), and Don't Make Waves (1967). Sammy Going South was entered into the 3rd Moscow International Film Festival. A project to film Ionesco's Rhinoceros, which would have starred Tony Hancock and Barbara Windsor, fell through at the last minute. In 1969 he returned to the United States after being appointed Dean of the film school of the California Institute of the Arts, giving up the position in 1978 to become a professor at the school.

Some of Mackendrick's most notable students include David Kirkpatrick, Doug Campbell, Terence Davies, F. X. Feeney, Richard Jefferies, James Mangold, Stephen Mills, Thom Mount, Sean Daniel, Bruce Berman, Gregory Orr, Don Di Pietro, Michael Pressman, Douglas Rushkoff, Lee Sheldon,  David Brisbin, and Henry Golas amongst others.

Mackendrick suffered from severe emphysema for many years and as a result, was unable to go home to Europe during much of his time at the college. He stayed with the school until he died of pneumonia in 1993, aged 81. His remains are buried at Westwood Village Memorial Park Cemetery.

Filmography

Director
  Whisky Galore! (1949)
  The Man in the White Suit (1951)
  Mandy (1952)
  The Maggie (1954)
  The Ladykillers (1955)
  Sweet Smell of Success (1957)
  Sammy Going South (1963)
  A High Wind in Jamaica (1965)
  Don't Make Waves (1967)

Writer
 Midnight Menace (1937)
Saraband for Dead Lovers (1948)
Dance Hall (1950)
 Sweet Smell of Success (1957) (uncredited)

Further reading
 Lethal Innocence: The Cinema of Alexander Mackendrick by Philip Kemp
 McArthur, Colin (1983), The Maggie, in Hearn, Sheila G. (ed.), Cencrastus No. 12, Spring 1983, pp. 10 – 14, 
 On Film-Making : An Introduction to the Craft of the Director by Alexander Mackendrick (edited by Paul Cronin).

References

External links

Senses of Cinema: Alexander Mackendrick
Mackendrick retrospective at the Harvard Film Archive

1912 births
1993 deaths
American expatriates in the United Kingdom
American film directors
American people of Scottish descent
Alumni of the Glasgow School of Art
Artists from Boston
Burials at Westwood Village Memorial Park Cemetery
California Institute of the Arts faculty
Civil servants in the Ministry of Information (United Kingdom)
Alexander Mackendrick
Deaths from emphysema
People educated at Hillhead High School
Propaganda film directors